In telecommunications, a field strength meter is an instrument that measures the electric field strength emanating from a transmitter.

The relation between the electric field and the transmitted power

In ideal free space, the electric field strength produced by a transmitter with an isotropic radiator is readily calculated.

 

where
 is the electric field strength in volts per meter
 is the transmitter power output in watts
 is the distance from the radiator in meters

The factor  is an approximation of 

where  is the impedance of free space.     is the symbol for ohms.

It is clear that electric field strength is inversely proportional to the distance between the transmitter and the receiver. However, this relation is impractical for calculating the field strength produced by terrestrial transmitters, where reflections and attenuation caused by objects around the transmitter or receiver may affect the electrical field strength considerably.

Field strength meter 
Field strength meter is actually a simple receiver. The RF signal is detected and fed to a microammeter, which is scaled in dBμ. The frequency range of the tuner is usually within the terrestrial broadcasting bands. Some FS meters can also receive satellite (TVRO and RRO) frequencies. Most modern FS meters have AF and VF circuits and can be used as standard receivers. Some FS meters are also equipped with printers to record received field strength.

Antennas
When measuring with a field strength meter it is important to use a calibrated antenna such as the standard antenna supplied with the meter. For precision measurements the antenna must be at a standard height. Gain correction tables may be provided with the meter, that take into account the change of antenna gain with frequency.

Minimum field strength criteria
The CCIR defines the minimum field strength for satisfactory reception. These are shown in the table below. (Band II is reserved for FM radio broadcasting and the other bands are reserved for TV broadcasting.)

References 

Electromagnetic radiation meters
Broadcast engineering